Parliamentary Costs Act is a stock short title used in the United Kingdom for legislation relating to parliamentary costs.

List
The Parliamentary Costs Act 2006

The Parliamentary Costs Acts 1847 to 1879 is the collective title of the following Acts:
The House of Commons Costs Taxation Act 1847  (10 & 11 Vict c 69)
The House of Lords Costs Taxation Act 1849 (12 & 13 Vict c 78)
The Parliamentary Costs Act 1865 (28 & 29 Vict c 27)
The Parliamentary Costs Act 1867 (30 & 31 Vict c 136)
The Parliamentary Costs Act 1871 (34 & 35 Vict c 3)
The House of Commons Costs Taxation Act 1879 (42 & 43 Vict c 17)

See also
List of short titles

References

Lists of legislation by short title and collective title